Christopher Langhorne (born 18 September 1940) is a British field hockey player. He competed at the 1964 Summer Olympics and the 1972 Summer Olympics.

References

External links
 

1940 births
Living people
British male field hockey players
Olympic field hockey players of Great Britain
Field hockey players at the 1964 Summer Olympics
Field hockey players at the 1972 Summer Olympics
People from Hammersmith
Sportspeople from London